Pietro Dini (died 1625) was a Roman Catholic prelate who served as Archbishop of Fermo (1621–1625).

Biography
On 19 April 1621, Pietro Dini was appointed during the papacy of Pope Gregory XV as Archbishop of Fermo.
On 9 May 1621, he was consecrated bishop by Ottavio Bandini, Cardinal-Bishop of Palestrina, with Galeazzo Sanvitale, Archbishop Emeritus of Bari-Canosa,  and Luca Alemanni, Bishop Emeritus of Volterra, serving as co-consecrators. 
He served as Archbishop of Fermo until his death in August 1625.

Episcopal succession
While bishop, he was the principal co-consecrator of: 
Alexandre della Stufa, Bishop of Montepulciano (1623); and 
Lorenzo Campeggi, Bishop of Cesena (1624).

He also ordained Giulio Cesare Sacchetti (1623) to the priesthood.

References 

17th-century Italian Roman Catholic archbishops
Bishops appointed by Pope Gregory XV
1625 deaths